Prisoners is a 1982 American-New Zealand drama film directed by Peter Werner and starring Tatum O'Neal, Colin Friels and David Hemmings.

For unclear reasons, the film has never been released.  The New Zealand Archive of Film, Television and Sound states that a financial dispute was allegedly the reason for the shelving of the completed film. According to New Zealand film historians Helen Martin and Sam Edwards, "One rumour has it that a relative of one of the actors bought the film to prevent its release."

Plot
An American moves his family to New Zealand where he takes charge of a prison in Wellington. His young daughter begins to have a love affair with one of the prisoners in his charge.

Cast
 Tatum O'Neal as Christie
 Colin Friels as Nick
 Shirley Knight as Virginia
 David Hemmings as Wilkens
 Bruno Lawrence as Peeky
 Ralph Cotterill as Holmby
 John Bach as Bodell
 Michael Hurst as Sciano
 Reg Ruka as Monkey
 Rob Jayne as Maslow
 Norman Fairley as Lewitt
 Peter Rowley as Hapstood
 Karl Bradley as Steel
 Richard Moss as Dunham
 Timothy Lee as Watts

Production
The film was shot in Auckland from 29 June to 14 August 1982. Its budget was approximately $4.2 million.

References

External links

Unreleased films
Unreleased American films
1982 films
New Zealand drama films
American drama films
1982 drama films
Films directed by Peter Werner
1980s English-language films